Combray is a commune in the Calvados department in Normandy in north-western France.

Combray is also an imagined village in Marcel Proust's À la recherche du temps perdu (In Search of Lost Time), a book which was strongly inspired by the village of his childhood, Illiers, which has now been renamed Illiers-Combray in his honor. Combray is the title of the first part of the first volume of À la recherche du temps perdu, titled Du côté de chez Swann (Swann's Way).

There is a medieval motte-and-bailey castle.

Population

References

Communes of Calvados (department)